South Sea Bubble is a play by the English actor and dramatist Noël Coward. It was written in 1949 but not performed until 1951, and not in its final form until 1956. The play was moderately successful in 1956 but failed to match the popularity of Coward's pre-war hits.

Background
The play is named after the South Sea Bubble, an economic bubble that arose from speculation in the South Sea Company.

The play was originally written as a vehicle for Gertrude Lawrence, titled Home and Colonial. Coward intended her to open in it after the conclusion of her run in The King and I, but her unexpected death meant that she never played it. The play was retitled Island Fling, which opened in 1951 with Claudette Colbert in the lead. It ran for eight performances in Westport, Connecticut, US.

The final version of the play opened as South Sea Bubble, at the Lyric Theatre in the West End, on 25 April 1956. It was directed by William Chappell and starred Vivien Leigh as Sandy Shotter, the wife of the governor of Samolo, a British island colony in the South Seas.  Leigh left the cast in August 1956 and was succeeded by Elizabeth Sellars.  The play ran until Christmas 1956, a total of 276 performances.

Samolo, a British possession in the south Pacific, was invented by Coward for his post-war musical Pacific 1860, and reused not only in South Sea Bubble, but in the author's only novel, Pomp and Circumstance (1960) in which the Shotters reappear, and in the play Volcano, written in 1956 but not staged until 2012.

Original London cast
John Blair Kennedy ("Boffin") – Arthur Macrae
Captain Christopher Mortlock – Peter Barkworth
Sir George Shotter – Ian Hunter
Lady Alexandra "Sandy" Shotter – Vivien Leigh
Punalo Alani – Alan Webb
Edward Honey – John Moore
Cuckoo Honey – Joyce Carey
Admiral Turling – Nicholas Grimshaw
Mrs Turling – Daphne Newton
Robert Frome – Eric Phillips
Hali Alani – Ronald Lewis

Synopsis

The governor of the south seas island of Samolo, Sir George Shotter, is a liberal-minded Englishman from a modest family background. He favours self-government for the island, but is opposed by an old-Etonian local grandee, Hali Alani. At Shotter's instigation, Lady Alexandra ("Sandy") uses her considerable personal charms to try to win Alani round to more progressive ideas. At Government House he responds warmly but decorously to her, but, irritated by spiteful insinuations from the wife of one of Shotter's colleagues, Sandy is provoked into visiting Hali later at his beach hut. He mistakes the nature of her overtures, and she finds it necessary to knock him out, hitting him on the head with a bottle of local spirit. The progress of events is observed with acid detachment by the novelist Boffin Kennedy. Scandal threatens to overtake Sandy, but with a combination of bluff and luck, and the gallantry of Hali, she survives with her reputation intact and island life continues much as before.

Critical reception
The notices were mixed. The Daily Express judged the play Coward's best for ten years.  The Observer found the conservative politics of the piece and its dialogue ("an anthology of Coward cliché") equally unpleasing. The Times thought the scene where Sandy knocks Hali out "not very much of a comedy". The Manchester Guardian found the same scene "one of the crispest and most eloquent moments that the English comedy stage has provided for years," but thought the author's touch uncertain elsewhere.

Notes

References
 
 

1949 plays
Plays by Noël Coward
South Sea Bubble